Ryan McLeod (born September 21, 1999) is a Canadian professional ice hockey forward for the Edmonton Oilers in the National Hockey League (NHL).

Playing career
McLeod was drafted by the Oilers in the second round of the 2018 NHL Entry Draft. He played junior hockey with the Mississauga Steelheads and Saginaw Spirit of the Ontario Hockey League until turning pro at the end of the 2018–19 season, signing an entry level contract with the Oilers on May 1, 2019.

On November 14, 2021, McLeod scored his first NHL goal against the St. Louis Blues.

On September 22, 2022, McLeod signed a 1-Year contract extension with the Oilers for $798,000.

Personal
McLeod was born and raised in Mississauga, Ontario, the son of Richard and Judi McLeod and first learned to skate on their backyard rink at the age of 18 months. He has two older brothers who also play professional hockey, Matt who currently plays for the Belfast Giants in Northern Ireland and Michael who currently plays for the New Jersey Devils. 

In childhood, McLeod was a fan of both the Edmonton Oilers and Toronto Maple Leafs, and said he favoured the Oilers because his favourite player growing up was Ryan Smyth.

Career statistics

Regular season and playoffs

International

References

External links

1999 births
Living people
Bakersfield Condors players
Canadian ice hockey centres
Edmonton Oilers draft picks
Edmonton Oilers players
Ice hockey people from Ontario
Mississauga Steelheads players
Sportspeople from Mississauga
Saginaw Spirit players
EV Zug players